Hu Mingfu (born 6 May 1962) is a Taiwanese para table tennis player. He was a bronze medalist at the 2000 and 2004 Summer Paralympics.

He is a member of the Bunun ethnic group.

References 
 

1962 births 
Living people 
Paralympic medalists in table tennis
Table tennis players at the 1992 Summer Paralympics 
Table tennis players at the 1996 Summer Paralympics 
Table tennis players at the 2000 Summer Paralympics 
Table tennis players at the 2004 Summer Paralympics 
Table tennis players at the 2008 Summer Paralympics 
Medalists at the 2000 Summer Paralympics 
Medalists at the 2004 Summer Paralympics 
Taiwanese male table tennis players 
Paralympic bronze medalists for Chinese Taipei 
Paralympic table tennis players of Chinese Taipei
Bunun people
FESPIC Games competitors
21st-century Taiwanese people